Vesteraalens Dampskibsselskab  was a Norwegian shipping company that operated ferries in Northern Norway.

The ferry service was founded by Richard With on 10 November 1881 at Stokmarknes in Nordland, Norway.  That same year, the shipping company's first ship - the steamer DS Vesteraalen from 1865 (ex-SS Arendal) was purchased from Arendals Dampskibsselskab. The company ran in the local transportation route, and then it started the first Coastal Express in 1893 with the ship  from 1891. The company merged in 1987 with Ofotens Dampskibsselskab and a new company formed; Ofotens og Vesteraalens Dampskibsselskab (OVDS). That company merged with Troms Fylkes Dampskibsselskap in 2006 to form Hurtigruten Group.

References

External links
History of Hurtigruten 

Ferry companies of Norway
Defunct shipping companies of Norway
Transport companies of Nordland
Hadsel
Companies established in 1881
1881 establishments in Norway
Companies disestablished in 1987